Choeromorpha multivittata is a species of beetle in the family Cerambycidae. It was described by Stephan von Breuning in 1974. It is known from Borneo.

References

Choeromorpha
Beetles described in 1974